Rural crafts refers to the traditional crafts production that is carried on, simply for everyday practical use, in the agricultural countryside. Once widespread and commonplace, the survival of some rural crafts is threatened.

Rural crafts are not considered part of arts and crafts, as they are produced for a practical means, and not for leisure. As they are a part of a general and simple set of skills that are easily learned, they have not been produced for sale by an artisan class of makers.

Examples 
Examples of goods and activities produced by rural crafts would be:

Basketry
Boat building
Boundary markers
Building cob walls
Building stone walls
Building wattles
Charcoal
Fish traps and fishing poles
Hay
Hedge laying
Hurdles and fences
Joinery
Path laying
Ponds
Pottery
Spinning yarn

Rural crafts will tend to vary in their styles from place to place, and will thus often contribute strongly to a sense of place.

As a job 
Offering training courses in, and demonstrations of, rural crafts is now becoming a viable job in some parts of the British Isles.

Rural crafts are distinguished from the "rustic" handicraft goods often seen in rural gift shops, such as at country stores.

Gallery

See also
 Aristaeus (ancient Greek god of rural crafts)
 Craft

Further reading
 'Mapping Heritage Craft', a UK research report of November 2012.
 E.J. Stowe. Crafts of the Countryside. Longmans, Green & Co., 1948.

References

Cultural geography
Rural tourism
Rural culture